Jakub Husník (29 March 1837 in Vejprnice, near Plzeň – 26 March 1916 in Prague) was a Czech painter, art teacher and inventor of the improved photolithography method.

Life
Husník was one of the ten children of Foersters. After the attending schools in Hlavatce and Benešov, he completed the Prager six-form high school. In 1853, he entered into the painter academy where he met Karel Klíč. He studied in Antwerp with professor Joseph Henri François van Lerius. After his return, he was active in the church of Uhrínevs. In 1863, he became a teacher at the High School in Tábor. In 1877, he was appointed as the art professor at the material High School. After one year, he also opened an independent workshop for lithography.

Research
Together with professor Schwarz, he examined the "wet process" when developing photographs. He first discovered the "zweitonige photograph". In 1893, he perfected the three-colored reproduction for the printing and announced first patents.

Works
Husník wrote specialized books concerning his inventions.

Honours and memberships
In 1907, Husník became an honorary member of the photographic society in Vienna and Berlin.

1837 births
1916 deaths
People from Plzeň-North District
Czech inventors
19th-century Czech painters
Czech male painters
20th-century Czech painters
19th-century Czech male artists
20th-century Czech male artists